In Our Time is a book of essays and illustrations written and drawn by Tom Wolfe, published in 1980.

References 

1980 non-fiction books
Books by Tom Wolfe
Farrar, Straus and Giroux books
Essay collections by Tom Wolfe